Vladimír Palko (born 20 May 1957  in Čuňovo) is a Slovak politician. He is a member of the National Council of the Slovak Republic and former interior minister of Slovakia. On 12 March 2008 he established a new party called Conservative Democrats of Slovakia after he left Christian Democratic Movement on February 2008, due to his scepticism and disappointment about leadership of Pavol Hrušovský.

References

External links

1957 births
Living people
Politicians from Bratislava
Christian Democratic Movement politicians
Conservative Democrats of Slovakia politicians
Members of the National Council (Slovakia) 1998-2002
Members of the National Council (Slovakia) 2006-2010
Comenius University alumni
Slovak mathematicians
Interior ministers of Slovakia